Rigoberto González (born July 18, 1970) is an American writer and book critic. He is an editor and author of poetry, fiction, nonfiction, and bilingual children's books, and self-identifies in his writing as a gay Chicano. His most recent project is Abuela in Shadow, Abuela in Light, a literary memoir. His previous memoir What Drowns the Flowers in Your Mouth: A Memoir of Brotherhood was a finalist for the National Book Critics Circle Award in Autobiography. He is the 2015 recipient of the Bill Whitehead Award for Lifetime Achievement from the Publishing Triangle, and the 2020 recipient of the PEN/Voelcker Award for Poetry.

Early life and education 
Born in Bakersfield, California, on July 18, 1970, and raised in Michoacán, Mexico, he is the son and grandson of migrant farm workers, both parents now deceased. His extended family migrated back to California in 1980 and returned to Mexico in 1992. González remained alone in the U.S. to complete his education. Details of his troubled childhood in Michoacán and his difficult adolescence as an immigrant in California are the basis for his coming of age memoir Butterfly Boy: Memories of a Chicano Mariposa.

During his college years he also performed with various Baile Folklorico and Flamenco dance troupes. He earned a B.A. degree in Humanities and Social Sciences Interdisciplinary Studies from the University of California, Riverside, and graduate degrees from the University of California, Davis, and Arizona State University in Tempe. His former teachers include the Chicano poets Gary Soto, Francisco X. Alarcón, Lorna Dee Cervantes, Pat Mora and Alberto Ríos, and the African American writers Clarence Major and Jewell Parker Rhodes.

Professional background
In 1997 González enrolled in a PhD program at the University of New Mexico in Albuquerque, but dropped out a year later to join his partner in New York City and to pursue a writing career. The two published their first books only a few months apart in the spring of 1999 and received numerous awards and recognitions for their works. In 2001, González pursued a career as an academic, holding distinguished teaching appointments at The New School, the University of Toledo, the University of Illinois at Urbana-Champaign, and Queens College/City University of New York.

González has lived and worked mostly in New York City and currently teaches at the writing program of Rutgers University in Newark, where he is distinguished professor of English and director of the MFA Program in Creative Writing. The recipient of a Lannan Literary Award, United States Artist Rolón Fellowship, Guggenheim Fellowship and a National Endowment for the Arts fellowship, the American Book Award from the Before Columbus Foundation, The Lenore Marshall Prize of the Academy of American Poets, The Poetry Center Book Award from San Francisco State University, the Shelley Memorial Award of the Poetry Society of America, a New York Foundation for the Arts Fellowship, a Lambda Literary Award, the Barnes & Noble Writers for Writers Award and of various international artist residencies including stays in Spain, Brazil, Costa Rica, Scotland, Switzerland and Italy (twice), he wrote a monthly Chicano/Latino book review column, from 2002 to 2012, for the El Paso Times. On July 22, 2012, González reached a milestone when he published his 200th review with the Texas newspaper. He is also contributing editor for Poets & Writers Magazine, a former executive board member of the National Book Critics Circle, a former contributing writer for Lambda Literary and the Los Angeles Review of Books, and a founding member of the Advisory Circle of Con Tinta, a collective of Chicano/Latino activist-writers.

In 2008 he was named to the position of 2009 Poet-in-Residence by the Board of Trustees of The Frost Place, the farm house of Robert Frost located in New Hampshire. He was also named one of 100 Men and Women Who Made 2008 a Year to Remember by Out magazine. In 2009, My Latino Voice named him one of the 25 most influential GLBT Latinos in the country.

Respected by members of the literary community for his versatility with literary genres and for his advocacy of emerging writers, González has championed a number of efforts to give visibility to marginalized voices. He curated and hosted The Quetzal Quill, a reading series at the Cornelia Street Café in Manhattan, and featured a number of poets on The Poetry Foundation blog Harriet, and on the National Book Critics Circle blog Critical Mass through the Small Press Spotlight Series. He wrote 109 entries for Harriet and "spotlighted" 66 authors on Critical Mass. He has also profiled for Poets & Writers Magazine the careers of Native American poets Sherwin Bitsui and Jake Skeets, Guyanese poet Rajiv Mohabir, Vietnamese American writer Ocean Vuong, Cambodian American poet Monica Sok, Latinx writers Alex Espinoza, Eduardo C. Corral, David Tomas Martinez, Javier Zamora, Erika L. Sánchez, Carmen Giménez Smith, and Kali Fajardo-Anstine, and African-American author Jacqueline Woodson. He retired his monthly column on Latinx literature for NBC-Latino online at the end of 2019.

On March 30, 2016, González was named, along with 9 other prominent writers, critic-at-large at the L.A. Times. He also served single terms on the Board of Trustees of the Association of Writers and Writing Programs (AWP).  and on the Board of Governors of the Poetry Society of America (PSA). As of 2018, he is a member of The Center for Fiction Writers Council  and serves on the board of Zoeglossia: A Community for Poets with Disabilities.

On December 6, 2016, González was celebrated for his work and literary activism at Poets House. The speakers at his tribute included Eduardo C. Corral, Ada Limón, Natalie Diaz, Saeed Jones, and the Poet Laureate of the United States, Juan Felipe Herrera.

As of 2018, González sits on the Editorial Advisory Board of the Machete Series (Ohio State University Press), which "showcases fresh stories, innovative forms, and books that break new aesthetic ground in nonfiction—memoir, personal and lyric essay, literary journalism, cultural meditations, short shorts, hybrid essays, graphic pieces, and more—from authors whose writing has historically been marginalized, ignored, and passed over".

As of 2019, he is faculty of the Randolph College Low-Res MFA in creative writing.

As of 2020, González serves as the new editor of the University of Arizona Press Camino del Sol Latinx Literary Series. His advisory board includes the notable writers Francisco Cantú, Sandra Cisneros, Eduardo C. Corral, Jeannine Capó Crucet, Angie Cruz, Natalie Diaz, Aracelis Girmay, Ada Limón, Jaime Manrique, Justin Torres, Luis Alberto Urrea, and Helena María Viramontes.

As of 2021, González serves on the editorial board of the Immigrant Writing Series at Black Lawrence Press, alongside Abayomi Animashaun, Sun Yung Shin, and Ewa Chrusciel.

Published works
 Full-length poetry collections
 To the Boy Who Was Night (Four Way Books, 2023), 
 The Book of Ruin (Four Way Books, 2019), 
 Unpeopled Eden (Four Way Books, 2013), 
 Black Blossoms (Four Way Books, 2011), 
 Other Fugitives and Other Strangers (Tupelo Press, 2006), 
 So Often the Pitcher Goes to Water until It Breaks (University of Illinois Press, 1999), 

Poetry chapbook
 Our Lady of the Crossword (A Midsummer Night's Press, 2015)

 Bilingual children's books
 Antonio’s Card/ La Tarjeta de Antonio (Children's Book Press, 2005)
 Soledad Sigh-Sighs/ Soledad Suspiros (Children's Book Press, 2003).

 Early reader books in Spanish for Benchmark Education Company
 Allá en el rancho grande
 Bronceado por la nieve
 La chinampa de Xóchitl
 ¿Cómo se llama el conejito?
 Frida y La Adelita
 La hormiguita Sarita
 La laguna de los lirios de agua
 La magia de La Guajira
 Los músicos de Morelia
 La piñata de tecolote
 La parcela
 Octavio Larrazano: campeón del pueblo
 Operación Deditos Envueltos
 Perdidos en El Yunque
 Roque
 Sebastián, joven historiano
 Tere y el taller de los alebrijes
 Tiembla la tierra

 Novels
 Mariposa U. (Tincture Books, 2015)
 Mariposa Gown (Tincture Books, 2012)
 The Mariposa Club (Alyson Books, 2009; Tincture Books, 2010), 
 Crossing Vines (University of Oklahoma Press, 2003), . 

 Memoirs and other nonfiction
 Abuela in Shadow, Abuela in Light (University of Wisconsin Press, 2022), 
 What Drowns the Flowers in Your Mouth: A Memoir of Brotherhood (University of Wisconsin Press, 2018), 
 Pivotal Voices, Era of Transition: Toward a 21st Century Poetics (University of Michigan Press, 2017)
 Autobiography of My Hungers (University of Wisconsin Press, 2013), 
 Red-Inked Retablos: Essays (University of Arizona Press, 2013), 
 Butterfly Boy: Memories of a Chicano Mariposa (University of Wisconsin Press, 2006), 

 Short story collections
 Men without Bliss (University of Oklahoma Press, 2008), 

Works edited
 Ploughshares (Spring 2019, Volume 45, No. 1)
 Xicano Duende: A Select Anthology (Bilingual Press, 2011)
 Camino del Sol: Fifteen Years of Latina and Latino Writing (University of Arizona Press, 2010)

See also

 List of Mexican American writers
 Latino poetry
 Latino literature

References

Sources
 Library of Congress Online Catalog > Rigoberto González

External links
 Rigoberto Gonzalez's home page
 Interview with González on America: The National Catholic Review
 Interview with González on Café Américain
 Interview with González on The College of St. Rose Blog
 Interview with González on Divedapper
 Interview with González on La Bloga
 Interview with González on Lambda Literary Foundation
 Interview with González on PEN/America
 Interview with González on Prairie Schooner
 Interview with González on Split This Rock
 Interview with González on Words on a Wire
 
Rigoberto González recorded for the literary archive in the Hispanic Division at the Library of Congress on April 10, 2014.

1970 births
Living people
American critics
American book editors
21st-century American memoirists
American male poets
American poets of Mexican descent
Arizona State University alumni
American gay writers
Hispanic and Latino American poets
Hispanic and Latino American short story writers
Lambda Literary Award for Gay Poetry winners
LGBT Hispanic and Latino American people
American LGBT poets
Rutgers University faculty
Writers from California
Writers from New Jersey
Writers from New York (state)
University of California, Davis alumni
University of California, Riverside alumni
Chapbook writers
American male short story writers
American short story writers
American Book Award winners
American male non-fiction writers
21st-century American poets
21st-century American male writers
Gay poets